Rafi Malik is an Indian actor who made his television debut as Rajveer Raghuvanshi in Sony TV's political soap opera Desh Ki Beti Nandini in 2013.

Career 
Rafi Malik made his debut with Sony TV's Indian soap opera, Desh Ki Beti Nandini in 2013 as protagonist Rajveer Raghuvanshi.

In 2015, he played lead in Director Kut's Productions drama series Tere Sheher Mein on Star Plus.

Since 2016, he is playing for Delhi Dragons in MTV Box Cricket League.

Filmography

References

External links 
 

Living people
1994 births
Indian male television actors
Male actors from New Delhi
Male actors in Hindi television
21st-century Indian male actors